Sergeant James Somers VC (12 June 1894 – 7 May 1918) was an Irish recipient of the Victoria Cross, the highest and most prestigious award for gallantry in the face of the enemy that can be awarded to British and Commonwealth forces.

Biography

Somers was born in Belturbet, County Cavan on 12 June 1894.  He was 21 years old, and a sergeant in the 1st Battalion, Royal Inniskilling Fusiliers, British Army during the First World War when the following deed took place for which he was awarded the VC.

On 1/2 July 1915, in Gallipoli, Turkey, when, owing to hostile bombing, some of his troops had retired from a sap, Sergeant Somers remained alone there until a party brought up bombs. He then climbed over into the Turkish trench and bombed the Turks with great effect. Later on, he advanced into the open under heavy fire and held back the enemy by throwing bombs into their flank until a barricade had been established. During this period, he frequently ran to and from his trenches to obtain fresh supplies of bombs.

In a letter to his father, Somers wrote:

"I beat the Turks out of our trench single-handed and had four awful hours at night. The Turks swarmed in from all roads, but I gave them a rough time of it, still holding the trench. It is certain sure we are beating the Turks all right. In the trench I came out of, it was shocking to see the dead. They lay, about three thousand Turks, in front of our trenches, and the smell was absolutely chronic. You know when the sun has been shining on those bodies for three or four days it makes a horrible smell; a person would not mind if it was possible to bury them. But no, you dare not put your nose outside the trench, and if you did, you would be a dead man."
 
He had previously been severely wounded during the Retreat from Mons in August 1914.
 
Later in the war, Somers served with the Army Service Corps on the Western Front. He died on 7 May 1918 (aged 24) leaving behind his parents, wife and son, and was buried with full military honours in Modreeny Church of Ireland cemetery. His Union Jack-draped coffin was carried on a gun carriage, led by the Pipe Band of the Cameron Highlanders. His headstone states simply:He stood and defended. The Lord wrought a great wonder.

References

Listed in order of publication year 
The Register of the Victoria Cross (1981, 1988 and 1997)

Ireland's VCs  (Dept of Economic Development 1995)
Monuments to Courage (David Harvey, 1999)
Irish Winners of the Victoria Cross (Richard Doherty & David Truesdale, 2000)

External links
 Location of grave and VC medal (Co. Tipperary, Ireland)
 

1894 births
1918 deaths
Military personnel from County Cavan
Irish soldiers in the British Army
People from County Cavan
Irish Gallipoli campaign recipients of the Victoria Cross
Royal Inniskilling Fusiliers soldiers
British Army personnel of World War I
British military personnel killed in World War I
British Army recipients of the Victoria Cross
Royal Army Service Corps soldiers